Thomas Leach is the name of:

 Tommy Leach (1877-1969), American baseball player
 Tony Leach (1903-1970), English international footballer

See also
Tomas Leach, British film director
Thomas Leech, Speaker of the Pennsylvania House of Representatives
Tom Leetch, American filmmaker
Thomas Leitch (born 1951), American academic and film scholar